Estelle D. Weigel Schmitt (November 18, 1914 – March 15, 1967) was an American figure skater in ladies singles.  Born in Buffalo, New York, she won the bronze medal at the United States Figure Skating Championships in 1934 and competed in the 1936 Winter Olympic Games.  Her older sister Louise also skated in the Olympics.

On October 9, 2018, Estelle was inducted into the Greater Buffalo (NY) Sports Hall of Fame along with her sisters, Louise and Mary.

Results

References
Estelle Weigel's profile at Sports Reference.com

1914 births
1967 deaths
American female single skaters
Olympic figure skaters of the United States
Figure skaters at the 1936 Winter Olympics
20th-century American women
20th-century American people